The Remixes is the first remix album by American singer and songwriter Mariah Carey, released on June 25, 2003, by Columbia Records. It is primarily a collection of remixes of some of Carey's songs: disc one is compiled of club mixes, while disc two contains Carey's hip hop collaborations and remixes.

Background and release
Following the demise of her marriage with Sony Music CEO Tommy Mottola after the release of her sixth studio album Butterfly (1997), American singer Mariah Carey negotiated her exit from record label Columbia in exchange for the release of four albums: #1's (1998; her first greatest hits album), Rainbow (1999; her seventh studio album), Greatest Hits (2001; her second greatest hits album), and The Remixes (2003; her first remix album). By the time of the latter's release, Mottola had resigned from Sony Music and Carey was consequently more creatively involved in the album than Greatest Hits, for which she admitted not knowing of its impending release in 2001. In a 2003 interview with the Scripps Howard News Service, Carey summed up The Remixes release as "a contractual Sony thing". However, Carey told The Hollywood Reporter she had always wanted to put out a remix album and reflected positively about its tracklist.

The Remixes received a staggered release worldwide as a cassette and compact disc. Sony Music Japan International released the album in Japan on June 25, 2003, to correspond with Carey's Charmbracelet World Tour dates in that country. While a United States release was scheduled for the previous day, Columbia Records delayed the album multiple times to July 1, August 5, and September 2, before releasing it on October 14. Elsewhere, The Remixes was released on October 6 in the United Kingdom, October 14 in Taiwan, October 21 in Canada, October 24 in South Korea, and November 3 in Australia.

Music
The Remixes is a dance, pop, and R&B album. Disc one features songs with disco, electronica, gospel, house, and techno influences, while disc two contains hip-hop collaborations with rappers.
The album features Carey's duet with Busta Rhymes, "I Know What You Want" (2003), originally recorded for Rhymes' album It Ain't Safe No More. It also includes two tracks previously only available in Japan: the So So Def Remix of "The One", a canceled single from Carey's Charmbracelet (2002) album; and the remix of "Miss You" featuring Jadakiss, which was originally recorded for Charmbracelet and samples "It's All About the Benjamins", which featured Jadakiss as part of The Lox alongside Diddy, Lil' Kim and The Notorious B.I.G. 

Five of the tracks on disc two - "Breakdown" (1997), "Sweetheart" (1998), "Crybaby" (1999), "Miss You" and "I Know What You Want" - are not remixes at all. All three of Carey's record labels - Columbia Records, Virgin Records and Island Records - agreed to license tracks for the album, while "I Know What You Want" was licensed from J Records.

Critical reception

Music critics opined on the release of a remix album and the remixes themselves. Kevin C. Johnson of the St. Louis Post-Dispatch considered a remix album better than another greatest hits compilation, the Malay Mails Yushaimi Yahaya said it was "a commercial strategy to sell old songs", and R. S. Murthi of the New Straits Times felt it indicated Carey was "desperate to boost flagging sales". Reviewing for Slant Magazine, Sal Cinquemani thought Carey's enthusiasm for the project disproved the latter's notions. He viewed the album as suited to dedicated fans rather than general audiences, as did Yahaya and Billboards Michael Paoletta. Apart from "Emotions", Scott Iwasaki of the Deseret News considered the remixes "just as boring as the originals". In contrast, Johnson felt the remixes enhanced Carey's songs as they "lacked flavor" in their original forms. Tom Harrison of The Province said some songs make "radical departures" from the originals. AllMusic's William Ruhlmann agreed, stating, "in many cases, the songs as initially heard are virtually unrecognizable".

Reviewers wrote about both the dance and hip-hop discs. Derek Ali of the Dayton Daily News described the first as monotonous and The Denver Posts Elana Ashanti Jefferson questioned whether "the remix process entailed adding stale house beats and club sirens." Cinquemani thought some songs sound dated but praised Carey for re-recording her vocals. In contrast, Paoletta felt David Morales's production on disc one "remains fresh and alive" and New York Times music critic Kelefa Sanneh considered it complementary of Carey's voice. Sanneh thought disc two songs remixed by Jermaine Dupri were of lesser quality and chose "Breakdown" and "Miss You" as highlights for the dynamic between Carey and rappers. Jefferson thought the "vast pool of talent and influence" that went into producing tracks on disc two made the album worth more than one listen. Referencing the samples and rappers present, Ali chose "Fantasy", "Thank God I Found You", and "Loverboy" as highlights from disc two while Johnson selected "Loverboy", "My All/Stay Awhile", "Breakdown", and "Always Be My Baby".  Murthi disagreed, writing that the rappers failed to enhance the songs.

Commercial performance
The Remixes sold 40,687 copies in its first week of release in the United States. Jim Farber of the New York Daily News described the sales as poor for Carey but understandable for a remix album. It debuted and peaked at number twenty-six on the Billboard 200 albums chart, lower than the number three peak of her previous album Charmbracelet but higher than her prior compilation album Greatest Hits, which peaked at number fifty-two. The album spent a total of five weeks on the chart, the lowest of Carey's career at the time. It experienced greater success on the genre-specific Top Electronic Albums chart, where it spent two months at number one. As of November 2018, The Remixes has sold 289,000 copies in the country according to Nielsen Music. It was certified Gold by the Recording Industry Association of America in October 2019. As a double album over 100 minutes long, the album achieved Gold status after it sold 250,000 equivalent units instead of the standard 500,000 because its CDs are counted separately for certification purposes. Elsewhere, The Remixes peaked within the top forty of album charts in New Zealand, South Korea, and the United Kingdom.

Track listing
Tracks and composition details adapted from the album's liner notes. Track lengths adapted from Spotify.

Notes
 A signifies an additional producer
 C signifies a co-producer
 J The Japanese edition omits "The One" So So Def Remix and "I Know What You Want" and instead includes "All I Want for Christmas Is You" So So Def Remix featuring Jermaine Dupri and Lil' Bow Wow
 "Heartbreaker/If You Should Ever Be Lonely" interpolates "If You Should Ever Be Lonely", written by Val Young and Frederick Jenkins
 "Fantasy" Def Club Mix and featuring Ol' Dirty Bastard sample "Genius of Love", performed by Tom Tom Club
 "Honey" Classic Mix and So So Def Mix sample "The Body Rock", performed by the Treacherous Three
 "Dreamlover" Def Club Mix samples "Blind Alley", written by David Porter
 "Always Be My Baby" Mr. Dupri Mix contains a replayed portion of "Tell Me If You Still Care", written by James Harris III and Terry Lewis
 "My All/Stay Awhile" So So Def Remix contains a replayed portion of "Stay a Little While, Child", written by Carl McIntosh, Jane Eugene, and Steve Nichol
 "Thank God I Found You" Make It Last Remix interpolates "Make It Last Forever", written by Teddy Riley and Keith Sweat
 "Honey" So So Def Mix contains a replayed portion of "Hey DJ", written by Stephen Hague
 "Honey" So So Def Mix samples "It's Great to Be Here", written by Freddie Perren, Alphonso Mizell, Berry Gordy, and Dennis Lussier
 "Loverboy" Remix contains elements from "Candy", written by Larry Blackmon and Tomi Jenkins
 "Heartbreaker" Remix contains excerpts from "Ain't No Fun (If the Homies Can't Have None)", written by Ricardo Brown, Calvin Broadus, Warren Griffin III, Andre Young, and Nathaniel Hale
 "Crybaby" contains a replayed portion of "Piece of My Love", written by Timmy Gatling, Gene Griffin, Aaron Hall III, and Riley
 "Miss You" contains elements from "I Did it for Love", written by Terry Etlinger and Linda Laurie
 "The One" So So Def Remix contains elements from "Goodbye Love", written by Riley, Griffin, Hall, and Gatling

Charts and certifications

References

Mariah Carey remix albums
2003 remix albums
Columbia Records remix albums
Island Records remix albums
Albums produced by Bryan-Michael Cox